Thaxterogaster pallidirimosus is a species of fungus in the family Cortinariaceae.

Taxonomy 
It was described as new to science in 2014 and classified as Cortinarius pallidirimosus from specimens collected in Finland. It was placed in the subgenus Phlegmacium of the large mushroom genus Cortinarius.

In 2022 the species was transferred from Cortinarius and reclassified as Thaxterogaster pallidirimosus based on genomic data.

Description 
Fruitbodies are distinguished in the field by their cream-coloroured caps with hygrophanous streaks, the honey-like odor of the flesh, and the association with birch.

Etymology 
The specific epithet pallidirimosus refers to the pale, streaked cap. Thaxterogaster caesiophylloides is a closely related sister species.

Habitat and distribution 
The fungus is found throughout Fennoscandia, in Russia, and in Oregon (United States). It fruits on the ground singly or in small groups in boreal forest, mesic forest, and mixed forests with birch.

References

External links

pallidirimosus
Fungi described in 2014
Fungi of Europe
Fungi of the United States
Fungi without expected TNC conservation status